Na Pali can refer to:

Nā Pali Coast State Park (a portion of the Nā Pali coast) in Kaua'i
Return to Na Pali expansion pack for the computer game Unreal